South Africa competed at the 2004 Summer Paralympics in Athens, Greece. The team included 51 athletes, 31 men and 20 women. Competitors from South Africa won 35 medals, including 15 gold, 13 silver and 7 bronze to finish 13th in the medal table.

Medallists

Sports

Athletics

Men's track

Men's field

Women's track

Women's field

Cycling

Men's road

Men's track

Women's road

Women's track

Equestrian

Powerlifting

Men

Women

Sailing

Shooting

Swimming

Men

Women

Table tennis

Men

Women

Wheelchair tennis

Men

See also
South Africa at the Paralympics
South Africa at the 2004 Summer Olympics

References 

Nations at the 2004 Summer Paralympics
2004
Summer Paralympics